RunScanner is a freeware Microsoft Windows system utility which scans a windows system for all configured running programs and autostart locations.

History
The program was created as a "best of both worlds" effort to combine all positive features in similar programs like HijackThis, Autoruns and Silentrunners.
Unlike similar programs, RunScanner connects to an online database to rate the good and the bad items.
The main purpose of the database is to do whitelisting  instead of blacklisting.

Usage
RunScanner scans all windows autostart locations and gives the user the possibility to delete misconfigured and malware items.
Inexperienced users can post their log files to forums where specialist helpers can help them to solve their malware problems.
Advanced users can use all features that modern malware fighters have come to expect.
Unlike other similar software, RunScanner can also exchange binary files with other users.

Main features
 Scanning of 100+ hijack locations
 Verification of file signatures
 MD5 hash calculation of files
 Online malware analysis of results
 Extended filters
 Item marking
 Powerful process killer
 Plain text logfile generation
 Binary .run logfile generation
 Hosts file editor

See also
Spy software
Malware
Targeted threat
Vulnerability (computing)

References

External links 
 Official site

Spyware removal
Windows-only freeware